× Perreiraara, abbreviated  Prra. in the horticultural trade (although sometimes mistakenly listed as Perr.), is the nothogenus for intergeneric hybrids between the orchid genera Aerides, Rhynchostylis and Vanda (Aer. x Rhy. x V.).

In recent years, popular varieties of this genus for home growers include Prra. 'Bangkok Sunset', Prra. 'Sunshine Padriew' (a 'Bangkok Sunset' crossed back to a Rhynchostylis gigantea), Prra. Rapeepath (a 'Bangkok Sunset' crossed to × Vandachostylis 'Pine Rivers'), and Prra. 'LeBeau Blue' (an Aerides lawrenceae × Vandachostylis 'Sasicha').

References

Orchid nothogenera
Aeridinae